Norcarane, or bicyclo[4.1.0]heptane, is a colorless liquid. It is an organic compound prepared using the Simmons–Smith reaction, by the action of diiodomethane and a zinc-copper couple on cyclohexene in diethyl ether.

References

Hydrocarbons
Cyclopropanes
Cyclohexanes
Bicycloalkanes